The 2021 World Para Snow Sports Championships was an international disability sport competition held in Lillehammer, Norway from 8 to 23 January 2022. It was the inaugural edition of the World Para Snow Sports Championships with para-alpine skiing, para cross-country skiing, para biathlon and para snowboard being held. It was scheduled for 7 to 20 February 2021 but it was postponed due to the COVID-19 pandemic in Norway. The rescheduled event retained 2021 in its name.

The biathlon and cross-country skiing events were held at the Birkebeineren Ski Stadium and the alpine skiing and snowboard events were held at Hafjell.

Sports

The following competitions were held:

 Alpine skiing (32 medal events, of which 18 speed events: Downhill, Super-G, Super combined and 14 technical events: Slalom, Giant Slalom, Parallel Event)
 Biathlon (18 medal events)
 Cross-country skiing (20 medal events)
 Snowboard (14 medal events)

In total, 84 medal events were contested.

Medal summary

Alpine skiing

Men's events:

Women's events:

Biathlon

Men's events:

Women's events:

Cross-country skiing

Men's events:

Women's events:

Team events:

Snowboard

Men's events:

Women's events:

Medal table

References

External links
 2021 World Para Snow Sports Championships website
 2021 World Para Snow Sports Championships, Paralympic.org

World Para Alpine Skiing Championships
Alpine skiing competitions in Norway
Biathlon competitions in Norway
Cross-country skiing competitions in Norway
Snowboarding at multi-sport events
World Para Alpine Skiing
Sports events postponed due to the COVID-19 pandemic